The Iran women's national 3x3 team is a national basketball team of Iran, administered by the Islamic Republic of Iran Basketball Federation.

They competed in the first international tournament in 2017 after appearing in the 2017 Asian Indoor and Martial Arts Games.

Iran provided one of the upsets of the FIBA 3x3 World Cup 2019 with a 19-18 victory over No.2 seed Mongolia. It was their only victory in Amsterdam but proved to be a momentous triumph for a team of pioneers whose success has important ramifications in Iran. As of May 2021, they were the No.4 ranked team in Asia.

Competitions

Asian Indoor and Martial Arts Games

Roster
The following is Iran's roster for the 2017 Asian Indoor and Martial Arts Games:

Delaram Vakili
Rozhano Mahmoudi 
Gelareh Kakavanpour
S.Aireian Artounian

References

Women's national 3x3 basketball teams
Women's national sports teams of Iran